Jajpur Keonjhar Road railway station serves Jajpur district and Kalinganagar in Indian state of Odisha.

Outline
It functions within the jurisdiction of Khurda Road railway division. It is the nearest railhead for Kalinganagar.

History
During the period 1893 to 1896, 1,287 km (800 mi) of the East Coast State Railway, from Vijayawada to Cuttack was built and opened to traffic, and construction of the Vijayawada–Chennai link in 1899 enabled the through running of trains along the eastern coast of India. Bengal Nagpur Railway was working on both the Howrah–Kharagpur and Kharagpur–Cuttack lines, completed the bridge over the Rupnarayan in 1900 and the Mahanadi in 1901, thus completing the through connection between Chennai and Kolkata.

Passenger amenities
Jajpur Keonjhar Road railway station has computerized reservation system (CRS), dormitory, cloak room, refreshment room, tourist information counter, post office (RMS) and ATM.

References

Railway stations in Jajpur district
Railway stations in India opened in 1896
Khurda Road railway division